"The Schizoid Man" is an episode of the allegorical British science fiction TV series, The Prisoner. It was written by Terence Feely, directed by Pat Jackson and was the seventh produced. It was the fifth episode to be broadcast in the UK on ITV (ATV Midlands and Grampian) on Friday 27 October 1967 and first aired in the United States on CBS on Saturday 6 July 1968.

The episode stars Patrick McGoohan as Number Six and features Anton Rodgers as Number Two. The central theme of the episode deals with the psychology of identity.

Plot summary
Number Six is assisting Number Twenty-four ("Alison"), a telepathic young woman, in practising mind reading with Zener cards. In an extremely complex plot of bluff and double bluff, Number Two brings an agent who looks just like Number Six, and is referred to as "Number Twelve", to The Village. Number Twelve is also played by McGoohan, apart from some shots featuring a body double.

The real Number Six is subjected to an intensive course of aversion therapy, altering his tastes and instincts, and training him to do everything left-handed. He is drugged to wipe his memory of the treatment. When he awakes, he is treated as "Number Twelve", while the lookalike assumes the role of Number Six. The real Number Six is informed by Number Two of the plan to break "Number Six" (the impostor) by convincing him that he is not Number Six at all.

Six and Twelve engage in various challenges to prove which is the real Number Six; the aversion therapy allows the impostor to behave more like Number Six than the real Number Six does. In the presence of Number Two and Number Six, Number Twelve is challenged to demonstrate that his fingerprints are Number Six's. They are. He also has his characteristic left wrist mole, which Number Six has lost. Finally, Number Twenty-four is summoned because she supposedly has a unique "mental bond" with the real Number Six, but they fail a test with the Zener cards.

Just as he appears to be "breaking", the real Number Six mentally overcomes his brainwashing when he discovers a bruise on his fingernail that he got when Number Twenty-four tried to get his picture a bruise that, furthermore, has migrated from the base of his fingernail to midway, confirming that days or weeks have passed, not the single day shown on his calendar. He then gives himself an electric shock to reverse the therapy. He also physically overcomes the impostor, who reveals his name as Curtis. After being forced to reveal his password and remove the fake mole from his wrist, Curtis escapes and is then mistakenly killed by Rover.

Pretending to be Curtis, Number Six reports to Number Two that "Number Six is dead". Having "failed", he is to return to report failure. He is put blindfolded onto a helicopter to leave The Village. He believes himself to have duped Number Two into letting him escape, but the helicopter promptly circles back to The Village. Number Two reveals that he deduced the truth when Number Six agreed to give his regards to Number Twelve's wife, who is deceased.

Cast
 Anton Rodgers . . . Number Two
 Jane Merrow . . . Alison (Number Twenty-Four)
 Earl Cameron . . . Supervisor
 Gay Cameron . . . Number Thirty-Six
 David Nettheim . . . Doctor
 Pat Keen . . . Nurse
 Gerry Crampton . . . Guardian
 Dinney Powell . . . Guardian

Notes
 The Schizoid Man is the only episode in which Rover is mentioned by name.
 Alison is one of a very small number of Village residents or other characters on the series ever referred to by either a forename or surname.

Broadcast
The broadcast date of the episode varied in different ITV regions of the UK. The episode was first shown at 7:30pm on Friday 27 October 1967 on ATV Midlands and Grampian Television, on Sunday 29 October on ATV London, Southern Television, Westward Television and Tyne-Tees; on Thursday 2 November on Scottish Television, on Friday 3 November on Anglia Television, on Thursday 16 November on Border Television and on Friday 24 November on Granada Television in the North West. The aggregate viewing figures for the ITV regions that debuted the season in 1967 have been estimated at 11.7 million. In Northern Ireland, the episode did not debut until Saturday 3 February 1968, and in Wales, the episode was not broadcast until Wednesday 4 February 1970.

References

Sources
  – script of episode

External links

The Prisoner episodes
1967 British television episodes
Television episodes directed by Pat Jackson